The Lecideaceae are a family of lichens in the order Lecideales (Ascomycota, class Lecanoromycetes).

Genera
According to a recent (2022) estimate, the Lecideaceae comprise 29 genera and about 260 species. The following list indicates the genus name, the taxonomic authority, year of publication, and the number of species:
Amygdalaria  – 11 spp.
Bahianora  – 1 sp.
Bellemerea  – 10 spp.
Bryobilimbia  – 6 spp.
Catarrhospora  – 2 spp.
Cecidonia  – 2 spp.
Clauzadea  – 7 spp.
Cryptodictyon  – 2 spp.
Eremastrella  – 2 spp.
Farnoldia  – 6 spp.
Immersaria  – 8 spp.
Koerberiella  – 2 spp.
Labyrintha  – 1 sp.
Lecidea  – ca. 100 spp.
Lecidoma  – 1 sp.
Lopacidia  – 1 sp.
Melanolecia  – 7 spp.
Pachyphysis  – 1 sp.
Paraporpidia  – 3 spp.
Poeltiaria  – 8 spp.
Poeltidea  – 3 spp.
Porpidia  – 51 spp.
Porpidinia  – 2 spp.
Pseudopannaria  – 1 sp.
Rhizolecia  – 1 sp.
Romjularia  – 1 sp.
Schizodiscus  – 1 sp.
Stenhammarella  – 1 sp.
Stephanocyclos  – 1 sp.
Xenolecia  – 2 spp.

References

Lecideales
Lichen families
Ascomycota families
Taxa described in 1826
Taxa named by François Fulgis Chevallier